Denis ('Dinny') Lovegrove (25 September 1904 – 25 January 1979) was an Australian politician.

Born in Carlton (then a thoroughly working-class suburb of Melbourne), Lovegrove left school early, and held a variety of jobs including those of brass foundry worker, shipping office clerk and plasterer. In 1930 he joined the Communist Party of Australia, but he was expelled in 1933. Subsequently, when he publicly criticised the party, he was administered a severe thrashing in an attack carried out by communist thugs. He then joined the Labor Party and served on its state executive from 1938 to 1955 (holding the office of state president from 1943 to 1944). In addition, he was federal president of the ALP from 1953 to 1954. He was secretary of the Fibrous Plaster and Plaster Workers' Union (FPPWU) from 1935 to 1947, president of the Trades Hall Council in 1938, and a delegate to the Australian Council of Trade Unions. Until 1954, he was associated with the hardline anti-communist Industrial Groups; but in that
year he decisively broke with them, and remained loyal to the ALP and its leader John Cain (Premier 1952-55) after the 'groupers' were forced out. He was elected to the Victorian Legislative Assembly in 1955 as the member for Carlton, transferring to Fitzroy three years later. From 1955 to 1978 he was president of the FPPWU. For part of that period (1958–67) he was simultaneously  Deputy Leader of the Opposition, which during those years was led by Clive Stoneham. He moved to the new seat of Sunshine in 1967, retired from the legislature in 1973, and died at East Melbourne in 1979.

References

1904 births
1979 deaths
Australian Labor Party members of the Parliament of Victoria
Members of the Victorian Legislative Assembly
20th-century Australian politicians
People from Carlton, Victoria
Politicians from Melbourne